Stigmatopora narinosa, also known as the Southern Gulf pipefish is a species of marine fish belonging to the family Syngnathidae. The species can be found in patches of seagrass and algae in the shallow waters of Spencer Gulf and the Gulf St. Vincent, South Australia. Their diet likely consists of small crustaceans such as copepods and amphipods. Adult males have been measured at lengths up to 11.3 centimeters. Reproduction occurs through ovoviviparity in which the males brood eggs from December to March before giving live birth.

References

External links 

 Stimatopora narinosa at FishBase
 Stimatopora narinosa at Fishes of Australia

Syngnathidae
Fish described in 2007